Cafeara is a municipality in the state of Paraná in the Southern Region of Brazil.   It is located approximately 100 km (63 miles) to the north-west of Londrina.

See also
List of municipalities in Paraná

References

Municipalities in Paraná